The Chinese Ambassador to Belize was the official representative of the People's Republic of China to Belize until 1989.

Before 1989, there was a representative of the Government of Beijing to the Government of Belmopan. Afterwards, the Government of Belize broke off relations with Beijing and recognised ambassadors from Taiwan.

List of representatives

Belize
China